Paul Gregory is a former English professional squash player.

Paul was born on 2 July 1968 in London and represented Surrey at county level. Made his debut for England in the 1989 European Championships. Competed in the British Open Squash Championships throughout the nineties. He was National champion in 1991 but later switched allegiance and represented Greece from 1997.

References

English male squash players
1968 births
Living people